Nonnosus was an ambassador sent by the Byzantine emperor Justinian I to the king of the Axumites (in Ethiopia and parts of the Arabian Peninsula) around 530 CE. He wrote an account of that visit, now lost, that was read and summarized by Byzantine patriarch Photius in Codex 3 of his Bibliotheca. Per that summary, Nonnosus entered Ethiopia through the Red Sea port city of Adulis and journeyed overland to Axum. He described seeing a herd of 5000 elephants in the vicinity of Aua, between Adulis and Axum. Nonnosus' father Abraham had been an ambassador to the Arabs, and his uncle, also named Nonnosus, had been sent on an embassy by the emperor Anastasius I.

The mid-6th century Chronicle of Ioannis Malalas (Book 18.457) and the later chronicle of Theophanes include, without citing their source, a detailed description probably derived from Nonnosus' account of his meeting with the Axumite ruler. Malalas names him as Elesboas and calls him king of the Indians, while Theophanes names him as Arethas and identifies him as king of the Ethiopians. 
According to Malalas, the Byzantine ambassador performed proskynesis and was warmly received by the king, who was mounted on a spectacular gilded platform atop four elephants yoked together. The Axumite ruler, eager for good relations with Justinian, kissed the imperial seal on the letter Nonnosus presented, and agreed to wage war on the Persians on Justinian's behalf. In practice, however, Nonnosus' embassy failed to generate any significant military contribution by the Axumites.

Notes

References
Karl Otfried Müller, Theodor Müller, Letronne (Antoine-Jean, M.) (eds.): Fragmenta historicorum graecorum, Volume 4. (Paris, 1860), preserves the original Greek text and gives a Latin translation. It may be accessed online here. Freese's 1920 English translation of Photius's summary of Nonnosus is online at ToposText.

6th-century Byzantine historians
Byzantine diplomats
Justinian I
6th-century diplomats